The Frisching Faience Manufactory was a manufactory that produced high class faience manufactures between 1760 and 1776 in Bern, Switzerland.

The manufactory was founded by Franz Rudolf Frisching and his brothers Gabriel Friedrich (1731–1789) and Karl Albrecht (1734–1801) on the grounds of Franz Rudolf Frisching’s country estate, the Lorraine Gut, outside the Old City of Bern. The manufactory specialised in faience stoves. Because of protectionism the manufactory could not sell one faience stove in the city of Bern. However, the faience stoves of the Frisching Faience Manufactory were very popular with the patricians of Basel and the French-speaking part of Switzerland.

Locations with faience stoves made by the Frisching Faience Manufactory 
Historical Museum of Bern
Schloss Schadau in Thun
Schloss Hünigen in Konolfingen
The Blue and The White House in Basel
Le Palais du Peyrou in Neuchâtel

Literature 
 Walter A. Staehelin: Keramische Forschungen aus bernischen Archiven. In: Keramikfreunde der Schweiz: Mitteilungsblatt. Nr. 81 (1970), S. 3–34.
 Robert L. Wyss: Kachelöfen, in: Bern und die bildenden Künste, in: Illustrierte Berner Enzyklopädie, Bd. IV. Kunst und Kultur im Kanton Bern, Bern 1987, S. 107-109.
 Historisches Museum Bern: Geschirr für Stadt und Land – Berner Töpferei seit dem 16. Jahrhundert, Bern, 2007,  (BHM).

Fireplaces
Heaters
Companies based in Bern
Manufacturing companies of Switzerland
Ceramics manufacturers